The acronym CMHA may refer to:

Canadian Mental Health Association, a voluntary health organization
Chinese Mental Health Association, a charity in the United Kingdom
Community Mental Health Act, a 1963 American law
Cuyahoga Metropolitan Housing Authority, a public housing agency in Ohio